The 2022–23 Lechia Gdańsk season is the club's 79th season of existence, and their 15th continuous in the top flight of Polish football. The season covers the period from 1 July 2022 to 30 June 2023.

Players

First team squad

 

 

 

 

 

 

 
 

 

Key

Out on loan

Promoted from academy

Transfers

In

Out

Competitions

Friendlies

Summer

Winter

Ekstraklasa

League table

Polish Cup

Europa Conference League

References

Lechia Gdańsk seasons
Lechia Gdańsk
Lechia Gdańsk